Billy Ternent (10 October 1899 – 23 March 1977) was a British orchestra leader, popular from the 1940s to the 1970s, best known for backing Frank Sinatra and his work at the London Palladium.

Biography
Ternent was born Frederick William Ternent in Newcastle upon Tyne on 10 October 1899, and began his professional music career in 1927, joining Jack Hylton's showband, becoming its principal arranger and mutli-instrumentalist. He remained with the band until the outbreak of World War II, and proceeded to lead orchestras for the BBC throughout the early 1940s. He formed his own band in 1944, and began conducting pit bands for various West End theatre shows. In the 1950s, he provided the backing orchestra to Frank Sinatra when he toured the UK, who described him as "the little giant". From 1962 to 1967 he was the musical director for the London Palladium.

References

External links
 Billy Ternent discography
 Billy Ternent - fan page

British bandleaders
Dance band bandleaders
Musicians from Newcastle upon Tyne
1899 births
1977 deaths
20th-century British conductors (music)
20th-century English musicians